Tareq Al-Kaebi (born August 1, 1992) is a Saudi football player who plays for Al-Kholood as a midfielder and a right back.

References

1992 births
Living people
Saudi Arabian footballers
Al-Raed FC players
Al-Hazem F.C. players
Al-Jabalain FC players
Al-Kholood Club players
Place of birth missing (living people)
Saudi First Division League players
Saudi Professional League players
Saudi Second Division players
Association football midfielders
Association football fullbacks